Assauer is a surname. Notable people with the surname include: 
 Jerome Assauer (born 1988), retired German footballer who played as a striker
 Rudi Assauer (1944–2019), German football player and executive

Surnames of German origin
German toponymic surnames
German-language surnames